HC Energie Karlovy Vary (juniors) 
is a Czech ice hockey team based in Karlovy Vary competing on an international level in Czech Extraliga juniors. HC Energie won the Czech Extraliga juniors 2007/08 season and from the year 2012 to the year 2015 onwards competed in the MHL.
The team is using the nickname Wolf Pack. The home stadium of the club is KV Arena. The adult professional ice hockey team is HC Karlovy Vary

History 
The culture of ice hockey in the city of Carlsbad originates with the club called SK Slavia Karlovy Vary back in 1932. But it wasn't until several years after when the youth clubs were introduced. This resulted in structuring the team from juniors to adults.
 

In the 2007/08 season, Karlovy Vary won for the first time the league juniors finals under coach Mikuláš Antoník, when they defeated Zlín. Strong icons of the team at that time were Pavel Kuběna, Tomáš Schimt, Martin Rohan, and Jakub Mareček.

Martin Frk had been playing for the juniors for two years and became one of its most productive players. In the 2009/10 season, he scored 27 goals and 28 assistances in 39 matches in the junior section. His acceptance of the offer from overseas without the consent of the club in the summer 2010 caused the management to consider a legal appeal. Eventually, the club won compensation after the intervention of the IIFH.

In season 2010/11, Karlovy Vary advanced to the finals of Extraliga but lost 1:2 on games to Znojmo after the results of 7:3, 0:8 and 2:7.

MHL 

In early 2012, under an agreement with the Czech Ice Hockey Associations, HK Energie registers the junior team for the MHL. The agreement incorporates a clause ensuring the HK Energy remains in the institution of the united academies. This event marks the first time the Czech junior hockey club began competing regularly on international level. Reinforcements were brought from other clubs and two players were recruited from Slovakia.

HK Energy played the Western Conference division, with some games as distant as nearly 8000 km - town of Chabarovsk. The first game in Karlovy Vary MHL was played under the coach Karel Mlejnek on September 2, 2012, Wolf Pack defeated Patriot Budapest 4:1 and advanced from seventh place in the qualification to the playoff where they later on lost to Spartak Moscow 2:3 on games. At that time, eight Spartak's players had experiences from the KHL. Vojtech Tomeček earning total of 62 points scored 28 goals and 34 assists in 60 matches, Vladislav Habal was with an average of 2.12 goals per match fifth best goaltender of the regular season.

The results exceeded the expectations of Karlovy Vary. Marek Švec acknowledged the level of competition to be significantly better than the top junior league, on both physical and technical level.

Following the successful experience of the first appearance, HK Energy remained in MHL for several seasons. Team's solid performance is also an achievement of the coach Karel Mlejnek, especially the winning streak in December 2013 which guaranteed the participation of Wolf Pack in the playoffs. The team played the first round with  Yunost Minsk. Belarusian opponent led 2:0 on games, but the energy was able to turn the series and advance to the second round finishing just as the year before among the top sixteen teams. The Wolf Pack met their next opponent Spartak club and lost 1:3 on games. The coach of Spartak club Oleg Brataš called the Energy "really strong team"

Roster 

Coach Tomáš Mariška, Jiří Žůrek, Milan Čejka

Galerie

References

External links 

Sport in Karlovy Vary
Ice hockey teams in the Czech Republic